Derek M. Cianfrance (born January 23, 1974) is an American film director, cinematographer, screenwriter, and editor. He is best known for writing and directing the films Blue Valentine, The Place Beyond the Pines and The Light Between Oceans as well as the HBO miniseries I Know This Much Is True. For his contributions to the story of Sound of Metal, he received a nomination for the Academy Award for Best Original Screenplay with its director Darius Marder and Abraham Marder.

Early life and education
Cianfrance grew up in Lakewood, Colorado, and graduated Green Mountain High School, and then attended the University of Colorado Boulder, studying film production under avant-garde filmmakers Stan Brakhage and Phil Solomon.

Career
At 23, he wrote, directed, and edited his first feature film, Brother Tied, which premiered and was awarded at the International Filmfestival Mannheim-Heidelberg and was well received at festivals including Sundance.

His second feature, Blue Valentine, starred Ryan Gosling and Michelle Williams. The two actors became familiar with their roles several years before filming but never met in person. The project was originally slated to shoot in California, but Cianfrance relocated to Brooklyn so that Williams could be with her daughter. There were no rehearsals and Cianfrance rarely shot more than one take per shot. The film was originally given an NC-17 rating, despite having little nudity and no violence. It has since been changed to an R-rating after an appeal was filed by The Weinstein Company.

Blue Valentine star Gosling worked with Cianfrance again on The Place Beyond the Pines (2013), which followed a motorcycle stunt rider (Gosling) who becomes a bank robber to support his newborn son. Bradley Cooper also stars in the film. Principal photography was done in the summer of 2011. Location filming was done in upstate New York – Schenectady, Niskayuna, and Glenville areas in 2011.

Next, Cianfrance wrote and directed The Light Between Oceans (2016) a romantic drama  based on the 2012 novel of the same name by M. L. Stedman. An international co-production between the United States, Australia, the United Kingdom, and New Zealand, the film stars Michael Fassbender, Alicia Vikander, Rachel Weisz, Bryan Brown, and Jack Thompson. The film tells the story of a lighthouse keeper and his wife who rescue and adopt an infant girl adrift at sea. Years later, the couple discover the child's true parentage and are faced with the moral dilemma of their actions.

Since the early 2010s, Cianfrance had been working on a fictional documentary called Metalhead, which centered on a metal drummer who becomes deaf. The film featured the members of the band Jucifer portraying themselves. The project was developed for years with Cianfrance eventually passing the reigns over to his friend and The Place Beyond the Pines co-writer Darius Marder resulting in Sound of Metal (2019). Starring Riz Ahmed, the film premiered at the 2019 Toronto International Film Festival and was released by Amazon Studios in 2020. Cianfrance, Marder, and his brother Abraham Marder, received an Academy Award for Best Original Screenplay nomination for the film.

Cianfrance wrote and directed the HBO miniseries I Know This Much Is True, an adaptation of Wally Lamb's novel of the same name. The series premiered in Spring 2020.

In October 2021, he was set to write and direct Wolfman, replacing Leigh Whannell as director, along with screenwriters Rebecca Angelo and Lauren Shuker Blum. The film will star Gosling, marking their third collaboration.

Other work
Cianfrance is also known for his TV documentary work, which includes portraits of musicians Sean Combs and Run DMC and the Battleground basketball series. He is currently working on a television series called Muscle, for HBO, which he says will be a comedy series with a unique take on "character development."

Personal life
Cianfrance is married to actress and film director Shannon Plumb. Together, they have two children.

Filmography
Film

Television

Documentary work

Actor
 Towheads (2013) (as "Matt")

References

External links

1974 births
Living people
People from Lakewood, Colorado
University of Colorado alumni
American male screenwriters
American cinematographers
American film editors
English-language film directors
Film directors from Colorado
Screenwriters from Colorado